The 2013–14 Southern Illinois Salukis men's basketball team represented Southern Illinois University Carbondale during the 2013–14 NCAA Division I men's basketball season. The Salukis, led by second year head coach Barry Hinson, played their home games at the SIU Arena and were members of the Missouri Valley Conference. They finished the season 14–19, 9–9 in MVC play to finish in a three way tie for fourth place. They advanced to the semifinals of the Missouri Valley tournament where they lost to Indiana State.

Roster

Schedule

|-
!colspan=9 style="background:#800000; color:#FFFFFF;"| Exhibition

|-
!colspan=9 style="background:#800000; color:#FFFFFF;"| Regular season

|-
!colspan=9 style="background:#800000; color:#FFFFFF;"| 2014 Missouri Valley tournament

References

Southern Illinois Salukis men's basketball seasons
Southern Illinois
Southern
Southern